Willett Cove is a small cove on the south side of Seabee Hook, a recurved spit formed 1 nautical mile (1.9 km) west of Cape Hallett at the entrance to Edisto Inlet, Victoria Land. Surveyed in January 1956 by members of U.S. Navy Operation Deepfreeze I from the icebreaker Edisto. Named by Advisory Committee on Antarctic Names (US-ACAN) for James H. Willett of the Navy Hydrographic Office, who directed the establishment of astronomical control stations on Ross Island and Seabee Hook in 1955–56.

References

See also
Construction Point

Coves of Antarctica
Landforms of Victoria Land
Borchgrevink Coast